Andreas Frey (born 20 May 1965) is a Swiss sailor. He competed in the men's 470 event at the 1988 Summer Olympics.

References

External links
 

1965 births
Living people
Swiss male sailors (sport)
Olympic sailors of Switzerland
Sailors at the 1988 Summer Olympics – 470
Place of birth missing (living people)